Praça Rui Barbosa (also called Praça da Estação--Station Square in English) is a square in Belo Horizonte, Brazil.

It has this name due to its proximity to the Estação Central de Belo Horizonte (Central Station of Belo Horizonte). 
The square has the first public clock in the city.

Geography of Belo Horizonte
Parks in Brazil